"Hear the Drummer (Get Wicked)" is a song by English DJ Chad Jackson, released in 1990. It consists of samples, and peaked at No. 3 on the UK Singles Chart. The song was co-produced by Steve Mac.

The song itself has been sampled by Deekline in "Party People" (1999), by rapper Skepta in the song "Skepta" from Microphone Champion (2009), and by EDM duo Firebeatz in the song "Wicked" (2013).

Samples used
This is an incomplete list of samples used in "Hear the Drummer (Get Wicked)".

Marva Whitney - "Unwind Yourself" 1967
Afrikaa Bambaataa and James Brown - "Unity" from Unity, 1984 (12")
Afrique - "House of Rising Funk" from Soul Makossa, 1973 (LP)
Bobby Byrd - "Hot Pants - I'm Coming, I'm Coming, I'm Coming" from Hot Pants - I'm Coming, I'm Coming, I'm Coming, 1972 (7")
Gang Starr - "Movin' On" from Movin' On, 1988 (12")
Hijack - "The Badman Is Robbin'" from The Badman Is Robbin', 1989 (12")
Kool & the Gang - "Chocolate Buttermilk" from Kool and the Gang, 1969 (LP)
Kool & the Gang - "Give It Up" from Kool and the Gang, 1969 (LP)
The O'Jays - "For the Love of Money" from Ship Ahoy, 1973 (LP)
Public Enemy - "Welcome to the Terrordome" from Fear of a Black Planet, 1990 (LP)
Soul II Soul - a cappella version of "Back to Life" from Club Classics Vol. One, 1989 (LP)
Uptown - "Dope on Plastic" from Dope on Plastic, 1989 (12")

Charts

Weekly charts

Year-end charts

References

1990 singles
1990 songs
Song recordings produced by Steve Mac
British house music songs
British electronic songs